On 13 October 2006, the Brazil national futsal team and Timor-Leste national futsal team faced each other in an international futsal match that was part of the 2006 Lusophony Games, hosted that year by Macau. Brazil defeated Timor-Leste 76–0, setting a world record for largest win in an international futsal match. One of Brazil's players, Valdin, scored 20 goals, which is another record. It was Brazil's biggest margin of victory since they beat Uruguay 38–3 in the 1991 Pan American Games. Timor-Leste was coming off a 56–0 loss to Portugal, which was the previous world record.

Background

Brazil was the favorite to win the Lusophony Games, while this was one of Timor-Leste's first games. Brazil has always been one of the top futsal teams in the world. 
9 October: In the first day of competition, Angola defeated Macau 2–0, but was overshadowed by Portugal's 56–0 blowout of Timor-Leste. The Portuguese player, Israel, scored 11 goals himself while André Lima, his teammate, scored 10 goals. This was a little over one goal per minute. It was the world record for 4 days. Brazil did not play that day. 
10 October: In Brazil's first game, they beat Angola 7–0. Timor-Leste lost to the host side, Macau, 13–4. 
11 October: Brazil crushed Macau 27–0. Portugal narrowly defeated Angola on that day, 4–1. 
12 October: 12 October was a rest day. 
13 October: Besides the 76–0 game, Portugal blew out Macau, 22–0.

Line-ups
This is the lineup of players that were called up for the match. All Brazilian players scored at least one goal except for two, including subs. Brazil had an advantage with seven subs, against Timor-Leste's two.

The match
The match was played in Macau, in the Macau East Asian Games Dome, as did all the games, at 19:00 UTC+8.

Brazil wanted to beat Timor-Leste by more goals than Portugal did because of goal difference. The final result was 76–0, meaning almost 2 goals per minute.

Post-match
14 October: Brazil ties Portugal 1–1. It is Brazil's first goal conceded in the whole tournament. Brazil won the gold medal by goal difference. Timor-Leste loses again, to Angola, 24–3.

This is how the two countries wound up the tournament.
Brazil won the gold medal, and Timor-Leste came in last.

Response
There was not a lot of media attention to the subject. The game was talked about mostly in Brazil, Portugal, and Spain. The next Lusophony Games, the 2009 Lusophony Games, Timor-Leste did not compete in Futsal.

Brazilian striker, Valdin, said the following about the scoring: 

Brazilian futsal supervisor, Reinaldo Simoes, said after the match, 
  
Brazil then tied Portugal, 1–1.

References 

Futsal matches
2006 in futsal
2006 in Macau football
2006 in Brazilian football
Brazil national futsal team
Futsal in East Timor
Record association football wins
2006 Lusofonia Games
Futsal at the Lusofonia Games
Futsal in Macau